Burlingham is a hamlet in Sullivan County, New York, United States. Burlingham has a post office with ZIP code 12722.

References

Hamlets in Sullivan County, New York
Hamlets in New York (state)